The Peace River Block is an  area of land located in northeastern British Columbia, in the Peace River Country. In exchange for building a rail line across Canada to British Columbia, the Canadian Pacific Railway was given the Railway Belt,  of land on each side of the rail. This arrangement passed the provincial legislature on December 19, 1883, and passed the House of Commons of Canada on March 21, 1884, as the Settlement Act. As all the land northeast of the Rocky Mountains became a provincial reserve pending the Government of Canada's decision on what land to select prevented homesteading and land claims. After several surveys of the land the government took possession in 1907. The south boundary begins at the intersection of the Alberta-British Columbia border and the Twentieth Baseline of the Dominion Land Survey and the north boundary begins at the Twenty-third Baseline, however both boundaries are run at right angles to the Alberta-British Columbia Border without accounting for meridian convergence and thus deviate south of each baseline. Land within the block was initially surveyed using the 3rd and 4th Systems of the Dominion Land Survey, however much of the south and west parts of the block were eventually surveyed into district lots similar to other parts of British Columbia.

The Dominion government opened the southeastern corner of the block in 1912 for homesteading. The Dominion government administered the land from two offices: the first, Peace River Land Agency, in Peace River, Alberta and the second, Grande Prairie Land Agency, in Grande Prairie, Alberta. While the land was in Dominion control the province still provided roads, schools, and other normal provincial government services. Conflicts between the federal and provincial governments occurred over the jurisdiction over land, water, and mineral rights. An agreement was reached between the two governments on February 20, 1930, which returned the block and the Railway Belt to the provincial government at the same time that public land and mineral rights were transferred to the Prairie Provinces.  The agreement was implemented by the Natural Resources Acts and the Constitution Act, 1930.

See also 
 Peace River (disambiguation)
 Land Grant Railway

References 
 Calverly, Dorothea. "Peace River Block" in Lure of the South Peace. Dawson Creek, BC: South Peace Historical Book Committee, 1981.
 Taylor, W.A. Crown Lands, A history of Survey Systems, Registries and Titles Department, Ministry of Sustainable Resource Management, Victoria, British Columbia, 1975

Peace River Country
History of British Columbia